The Washington Area Theatre Community Honors, better known as the WATCH Awards, are theater awards recognizing excellence in Community theater in the Washington, D.C. area since 2000.

During the COVID pandemic, the WATCH Awards were put on hold. The are set to return in 2022.

History
Established in 2000 to honor people involved in local theaters throughout the D.C. area, the first award show was presented March 2, 2001. The creation of the WATCH Awards helped "increase the reputation of area community theater," according to Michael Toscano of The Washington Post.

Awards categories
In each of the forty categories, five nominees were selected based on the average scores of eight judges. In some categories, due to score ties, more than five nominees are announced. Nominations are provided in alphabetical order by nominee. The nominations are provided by category and then by theater at the end of the document.

 Technical Achievements
Outstanding Set Design
Outstanding Set Construction
Outstanding Set Painting
Outstanding Set Decoration and Set Dressing
Outstanding Properties
Outstanding Lighting Design
Outstanding Sound Design
Outstanding Costume Design
Outstanding Makeup Design
Outstanding Hair Design
Outstanding Special Effects

Performances by an Actor or Actress in a Play or Musical
Outstanding Cameo
Outstanding Featured Actress
Outstanding Featured Actor
Outstanding Lead Actress
Outstanding Lead Actor

Outstanding Achievement in Overall Production
Outstanding Stage Combat Choreography
Outstanding Choreography
Outstanding Music Direction
Outstanding Direction of a Play or Musical
Outstanding Musical
Outstanding Play

 Special Awards
The Leta Hall Award – For Outstanding Ensemble Performance in a Play or Musical

Winners and nominees

2000 

 2001 

 2002 

 2003 

 2004

 2005 

 2006 

 2007 

 2008 

 2009 

 2010 

 2011 

 2012 

 2013 

 2014 

 2015 

 2016 

 2017 

 2018 

 2019

See also

 Theater in Washington, DC
 Helen Hayes Award
 Gotham Awards

References

External links

American theater awards
Culture of Washington, D.C.
Awards established in 2000
2000 establishments in Washington, D.C.